Qiulin ( < LHC: *kʰu-lim < *khwə-rəm) was the name of a royal tribe in Xiongnu from the Han Dynasty to Northern Wei.

History
Xiongnu included part of five tribes: Luandi, Xubu, Huyan, Lan and Qiulin. Luandi tribe produced rulers of Xiongnu, while other tribes produced empresses.

During the Northern Wei, Qiulin tribe emigrated to Luyang, Henan. following the Chinese assimilation policy of Xiaowen, the Xiongnu of Qiulin took the surname Lin (林). The family became a branch of Liu (劉) family of Han Zhao.

See also
Han Zhao
Later Tang
Xueyantuo

References

Xiongnu
Ancient peoples of China